Peasemore is a village and civil parish in the English ceremonial and historic county of Berkshire in the West Berkshire unitary authority area, west of the A34 road and north of the town of Newbury.

Geography

Peasemore is a small community with a typical clustered centre. A selection of footpaths lead across surrounding fields and across lanes into the Berkshire Downs which surround the village on all sides.  All of the land of the village falls within this AONB.   It is west of the A34, a dual carriageway trunk route between the M40 motorway and Southampton) and NNW of Newbury.

History
Peasemore is mentioned in the Domesday Book. There is a plaque on the village hall relating to the entry. In 1978, Peasemore won Berkshire's best-kept village competition. The plaque for the award is placed in the entrance to St Barnabas' church, which is a Grade II listed building. The mainly mid-18th century church is one of many designed by G E Street.

Amenities and sport

Peasemore has a public house: The Fox at Peasemore. Its civil parish council hires out its village hall and hosts community and self-organised events.  It has dance classes, children's parties, fitness training, exhibitions and social gatherings. Its Church of England parish church joins in the East Downland benefice organising weekday events for nine parishes north of Newbury. Peasemore Cricket Club is the main organised sporting activity. At the sports field is a children's adventure play area run using the parish council precept.

Former amenities
Peasemore had a village school, built in 1850, closed in the 1950s. Its own post office in Hailey Lane closed around 1980 and was converted to a private residence. Now, the nearest grocery shop and primary school are in Chieveley which hosts the majority of weekday church events.

Transport
Buses connect the village with Newbury, service 107.

Notable residents
William Lyford, Anglican then non-Anglican clergyman and author, elected to the Westminster Assembly, rector (parish priest).
Miss Read, author, temporary headmistress at Peasemore.
David Cameron, Prime Minister, raised in Peasemore.

Demography

References

External links

 Peasemore Parish Plan
 Domesday Book online
 Peasemore Village website

Civil parishes in Berkshire
Villages in Berkshire
West Berkshire District